Colin McMillan (born 12 February 1966) is an English former professional boxer who competed from 1988 to 1997. He fought his way to the British featherweight title in 1991. After successfully defending his British title, he added the Commonwealth title in 1992 before beating Maurizio Stecca for the WBO featherweight title that same year. Known in fighting circles as Sweet C, McMillan lost his WBO belt on his first defence, when he was unable to continue against Rubén Darío Palacios due to a dislocated shoulder.

References

External links
 

1966 births
Living people
English male boxers
Featherweight boxers
World featherweight boxing champions
World Boxing Organization champions
Boxers from Greater London